Bazanovo is the name of several rural localities in Russia:
Bazanovo, Perm Krai, a village in Sivinsky District of Perm Krai
Bazanovo, Zabaykalsky Krai, a selo in Alexandrovo-Zavodsky District of Zabaykalsky Krai